Hello Kaun? Pehchaan Kaun! (English: Hello, who is it? You guess!) is an Indian show where the contestants mimic a famous celebrity. The show aired on STAR One from 27 December 2008 to 5 April 2009.

Overview
The show is hosted by well-known mimic Navin Prabhakar, who first shot to fame from his celebrated appearances in the show The Great Indian Laughter Challenge (season one). Prabhakar mimics different celebrities in different episodes. He has mimicked well-known actors Jeetendra, Pran, Johnny Walker, Kamal Hasan, Sunil Dutt, and several others. His own performance is inarguably one of the best mimicries in the entire show. The show is innovative as the first a mimicry contest on Indian TV.

The show is judged by Chunky Pandey and Suresh Menon.

The name of the show is a take on the catchphrase Pehchan Kaun (translation: Guess Who?) first popularized by Navin Prabhakar in his appearances in The Great Indian Laughter Challenge. After several dialogues of Sholay entered into the psyche and mannerisms of Indians, this is perhaps the first catchphrase to do so.

Contestants 
 Rooesh Mirkap as Hrithik Roshan
 Vishal Gaba as Himmesh Reshammia
 Sumedh as Aamir Khan
 Rameshwar Mahajan as Johnny Lever
 Raja Sagoo as Salman Khan
 Sanjay Keni as Arshad Warsi
 Mukesh Patel as Dhoni
 Deepak Kumar as Ritesh Deshmukh
 KT as Ajay Devgan
 Abhin Sinha as Akshaye Khanna
 Sandeep as Jim Carrey
 Rajkumar Prashad as Baba Ramdev
 Rajat Bhaghat as Salmaan khan
 Siraj Khan as Laloo Yadav & Nana Patekar

Hosts 

 Navin Prabhakar
 Aishwarya Sakhuja

Judges 

 Chunky Pandey
 Suresh Menon

See also
 The Great Indian Laughter Challenge

External links
 The Hunt for India's Best mimic

References

Indian stand-up comedy television series
2008 Indian television series debuts
Star One (Indian TV channel) original programming
Indian reality television series
2009 Indian television series endings
Hindi-language television shows
Cultural depictions of Amitabh Bachchan